The 2008–09 Minnesota Timberwolves season was the 20th season of the franchise in the National Basketball Association (NBA). The team  finished the season coached by Kevin McHale. After the season, McHale was dismissed though he would return as head coach for the Houston Rockets for the shortened 2011–12 season and would later guide the Rockets to the Western Conference Finals in 2015.

The Timberwolves drafted O. J. Mayo with the third pick in the first round of the 2008 draft. Soon, his rights were traded to the Memphis Grizzlies for Kevin Love. The team also drafted Mario Chalmers, but his rights was soon traded to the Miami Heat, where he would win two championships.

Draft picks

Roster

Regular season

Standings

Game log

|- bgcolor="#bbffbb"
| 1
| October 29
| Sacramento
| 
| Al Jefferson (21)
| Al Jefferson (10)
| Mike Miller (6)
| Target Center17,820
| 1–0

|- bgcolor="#ffcccc"
| 2
| November 1
| Dallas
| 
| Rashad McCants (18)
| Al Jefferson (12)
| Randy Foye (6)
| Target Center16,893
| 1–1
|- bgcolor="#ffcccc"
| 3
| November 2
| @ Oklahoma City
| 
| Al Jefferson (24)
| Al Jefferson (13)
| Randy Foye (6)
| Ford Center18,163
| 1–2
|- bgcolor="#ffcccc"
| 4
| November 5
| San Antonio
| 
| Al Jefferson (30)
| Al Jefferson (14)
| Sebastian Telfair (10)
| Target Center11,112
| 1–3
|- bgcolor="#ffcccc"
| 5
| November 7
| @ Sacramento
| 
| Kevin Love (20)
| Al Jefferson (9)
| Sebastian Telfair (7)
| ARCO Arena10,592
| 1–4
|- bgcolor="#ffcccc"
| 6
| November 8
| @ Portland
| 
| Al Jefferson (27)
| Kevin Love (7)
| Al Jefferson, Randy Foye (5)
| Rose Garden20,599
| 1–5
|- bgcolor="#ffcccc"
| 7
| November 11
| @ Golden State
| 
| Al Jefferson (25)
| Al Jefferson (12)
| Randy Foye (8)
| Oracle Arena17,422
| 1–6
|- bgcolor="#ffcccc"
| 8
| November 15
| Portland
| 
| Al Jefferson (26)
| Al Jefferson (6)
| Mike Miller (5)
| Target Center12,213
| 1–7
|- bgcolor="#ffcccc"
| 9
| November 16
| @ Denver
| 
| Al Jefferson (20)
| Al Jefferson (14)
| Randy Foye (6)
| Pepsi Center16,721
| 1–8
|- bgcolor="#bbffbb"
| 10
| November 19
| Philadelphia
| 
| Al Jefferson (25)
| Mike Miller (10)
| Sebastian Telfair (8)
| Target Center10,111
| 2–8
|- bgcolor="#ffcccc"
| 11
| November 21
| Boston
| 
| Al Jefferson (21)
| Craig Smith (7)
| Craig Smith (4)
| Target Center19,107
| 2–9
|- bgcolor="#bbffbb"
| 12
| November 23
| @ Detroit
| 
| Randy Foye (23)
| Craig Smith (9)
| Randy Foye (14)
| The Palace of Auburn Hills22,076
| 3–9
|- bgcolor="#ffcccc"
| 13
| November 26
| Phoenix
| 
| Al Jefferson (28)
| Al Jefferson (17)
| Mike Miller (6)
| Target Center11,708
| 3–10
|- bgcolor="#bbffbb"
| 14
| November 28
| @ Oklahoma City
| 
| Craig Smith (23)
| Al Jefferson (9)
| Randy Foye (7)
| Ford Center18,229
| 4–10
|- bgcolor="#ffcccc"
| 15
| November 29
| Denver
| 
| Randy Foye (25)
| Al Jefferson (13)
| Randy Foye (6)
| Target Center14,197
| 4–11

|- bgcolor="#ffcccc"
| 16
| December 1
| @ Charlotte
| 
| Randy Foye (23)
| Mike Miller (10)
| Mike Miller (5)
| Time Warner Cable Arena9,285
| 4–12
|- bgcolor="#ffcccc"
| 17
| December 3
| @ Orlando
| 
| Al Jefferson (19)
| Kevin Love (12)
| Randy Foye (5)
| Amway Arena15,705
| 4–13
|- bgcolor="#ffcccc"
| 18
| December 5
| @ New Jersey
| 
| Randy Foye (20)
| Al Jefferson (12)
| Randy Foye (5)
| Izod Center15,364
| 4–14
|- bgcolor="#ffcccc"
| 19
| December 6
| L.A. Clippers
| 
| Al Jefferson (28)
| Kevin Love (15)
| Randy Foye, Sebastian Telfair (5)
| Target Center10,863
| 4–15
|- bgcolor="#ffcccc"
| 20
| December 9
| Utah
| 
| Al Jefferson (21)
| Kevin Love (15)
| Randy Foye, Ryan Gomes (4)
| Target Center10,745
| 4–16
|- bgcolor="#ffcccc"
| 21
| December 10
| @ Denver
| 
| Al Jefferson, Randy Foye (26)
| Kevin Love (14)
| Randy Foye (6)
| Pepsi Center14,007
| 4–17
|- bgcolor="#ffcccc"
| 22
| December 12
| San Antonio
| 
| Al Jefferson (29)
| Al Jefferson (13)
| Randy Foye (6)
| Target Center15,336
| 4–18
|- bgcolor="#ffcccc"
| 23
| December 14
| @ L.A. Lakers
| 
| Al Jefferson (20)
| Al Jefferson (13)
| Randy Foye (6)
| Staples Center18,997
| 4–19
|- bgcolor="#ffcccc"
| 24
| December 15
| @ Sacramento
| 
| Al Jefferson (22)
| Kevin Love (15)
| Kevin Ollie (5)
| ARCO Arena10,593
| 4–20
|- bgcolor="#ffcccc"
| 25
| December 17
| Cleveland
| 
| Al Jefferson (20)
| Al Jefferson (11)
| Randy Foye (3)
| Target Center14,899
| 4–21
|- bgcolor="#ffcccc"
| 26
| December 20
| Houston
| 
| Al Jefferson (34)
| Al Jefferson (13)
| Al Jefferson, Rashad McCants (4)
| Target Center12,115
| 4–22
|- bgcolor="#ffcccc"
| 27
| December 23
| @ San Antonio
| 
| Al Jefferson (28)
| Randy Foye (16)
| Kevin Ollie (4)
| AT&T Center17,996
| 4–23
|- bgcolor="#bbffbb"
| 28
| December 26
| @ New York
| 
| Rashad McCants (23)
| Al Jefferson (15)
| Sebastian Telfair (8)
| Madison Square Garden19,763
| 5–23
|- bgcolor="#ffcccc"
| 29
| December 27
| Orlando
| 
| Rashad McCants (21)
| Kevin Love (10)
| Rashad McCants (4)
| Target Center17,003
| 5–24
|- bgcolor="#bbffbb"
| 30
| December 29
| Memphis
| 
| Al Jefferson (38)
| Al Jefferson (16)
| Randy Foye, Craig Smith (5)
| Target Center12,207
| 6–24
|- bgcolor="#ffcccc"
| 31
| December 30
| @ Dallas
| 
| Al Jefferson (21)
| Al Jefferson (9)
| Kevin Ollie (6)
| American Airlines Center20,264
| 6–25

|- bgcolor="#bbffbb"
| 32
| January 2
| Golden State
| 
| Al Jefferson (32)
| Al Jefferson, Ryan Gomes (10)
| Randy Foye (7)
| Target Center11,921
| 7–25
|- bgcolor="#bbffbb"
| 33
| January 3
| @ Chicago
| 
| Randy Foye (21)
| Al Jefferson (14)
| Sebastian Telfair (6)
| United Center20,516
| 8–25
|- bgcolor="#bbffbb"
| 34
| January 6
| @ Memphis
| 
| Randy Foye (23)
| Al Jefferson (12)
| Sebastian Telfair (9)
| FedExForum10,156
| 9–25
|- bgcolor="#bbffbb"
| 35
| January 7
| Oklahoma City
| 
| Randy Foye (32)
| Kevin Love (15)
| Randy Foye (6)
| Target Center10,272
| 10–25
|- bgcolor="#bbffbb"
| 36
| January 10
| Milwaukee
| 
| Rodney Carney (22)
| Kevin Love (12)
| Sebastian Telfair (11)
| Target Center15,007
| 11–25
|- bgcolor="#ffcccc"
| 37
| January 13
| Miami
| 
| Randy Foye (29)
| Al Jefferson (10)
| Randy Foye (8)
| Target Center10,856
| 11–26
|- bgcolor="#bbffbb"
| 38
| January 16
| @ Phoenix
| 
| Al Jefferson (22)
| Kevin Love (14)
| Mike Miller (5)
| US Airways Center18,422
| 12–26
|- bgcolor="#bbffbb"
| 39
| January 19
| @ L.A. Clippers
| 
| Al Jefferson, Craig Smith (20)
| Al Jefferson (17)
| Sebastian Telfair (9)
| Staples Center14,399
| 13–26
|- bgcolor="#ffcccc"
| 40
| January 20
| @ Utah
| 
| Al Jefferson (25)
| Kevin Love (9)
| Sebastian Telfair (9)
| EnergySolutions Arena19,911
| 13–27
|- bgcolor="#bbffbb"
| 41
| January 23
| New Orleans
| 
| Al Jefferson, Randy Foye (24)
| Al Jefferson (14)
| Randy Foye, Sebastian Telfair (8)
| Target Center18,224
| 14–27
|- bgcolor="#bbffbb"
| 42
| January 25
| Chicago
| 
| Al Jefferson (39)
| Kevin Love (15)
| Mike Miller (7)
| Target Center16,009
| 15–27
|- bgcolor="#bbffbb"
| 43
| January 26
| @ Milwaukee
| 
| Al Jefferson (23)
| Al Jefferson, Mike Miller (10)
| Randy Foye (7)
| Bradley Center12,914
| 16–27
|- bgcolor="#ffcccc"
| 44
| January 28
| Detroit
| 
| Al Jefferson (24)
| Kevin Love (10)
| Randy Foye, Mike Miller (5)
| Target Center14,232
| 16–28
|- bgcolor="#ffcccc"
| 45
| January 30
| L.A. Lakers
| 
| Al Jefferson (34)
| Al Jefferson (13)
| Sebastian Telfair (7)
| Target Center19,111
| 16–29

|- bgcolor="#ffcccc"
| 46
| February 1
| @ Boston
| 
| Al Jefferson (34)
| Al Jefferson (11)
| Randy Foye (9)
| TD Banknorth Garden18,624
| 16–30
|- bgcolor="#bbffbb"
| 47
| February 3
| @ Indiana
| 
| Randy Foye (19)
| Al Jefferson (15)
| Randy Foye (5)
| Conseco Fieldhouse11,015
| 17–30
|- bgcolor="#ffcccc"
| 48
| February 4
| Atlanta
| 
| Al Jefferson (18)
| Kevin Love (14)
| Mike Miller (4)
| Target Center13,745
| 17–31
|- bgcolor="#ffcccc"
| 49
| February 7
| @ Houston
| 
| Al Jefferson (36)
| Al Jefferson (22)
| Sebastian Telfair (9)
| Toyota Center16,815
| 17–32
|- bgcolor="#ffcccc"
| 50
| February 8
| @ New Orleans
| 
| Al Jefferson (25)
| Al Jefferson (14)
| Sebastian Telfair (6)
| New Orleans Arena16,046
| 17–33
|- bgcolor="#ffcccc"
| 51
| February 10
| Toronto
| 
| Randy Foye (33)
| Kevin Love (12)
| Mike Miller (5)
| Target Center12,722
| 17–34
|- bgcolor="#ffcccc"
| 52
| February 17
| @ Washington
| 
| Randy Foye (23)
| Kevin Love (11)
| Mike Miller (6)
| Verizon Center11,623
| 17–35
|- bgcolor="#bbffbb"
| 53
| February 18
| @ Miami
| 
| Sebastian Telfair (30)
| Brian Cardinal (10)
| Mike Miller (9)
| American Airlines Arena17,525
| 18–35
|- bgcolor="#ffcccc"
| 54
| February 20
| Indiana
| 
| Randy Foye (36)
| Kevin Love (12)
| Sebastian Telfair (6)
| Target Center13,777
| 18–36
|- bgcolor="#ffcccc"
| 55
| February 22
| L.A. Lakers
| 
| Sebastian Telfair, Ryan Gomes (20)
| Kevin Love (10)
| Randy Foye, Kevin Ollie (6)
| Target Center19,177
| 18–37
|- bgcolor="#ffcccc"
| 56
| February 24
| @ Toronto
| 
| Randy Foye (25)
| Mike Miller (12)
| Mike Miller (9)
| Air Canada Centre17,457
| 18–38
|- bgcolor="#ffcccc"
| 57
| February 25
| Utah
| 
| Ryan Gomes, Kevin Love (24)
| Kevin Love (15)
| Mike Miller, Sebastian Telfair (6)
| Target Center13,108
| 18–39
|- bgcolor="#ffcccc"
| 58
| February 27
| Portland
| 
| Craig Smith, Mike Miller (16)
| Ryan Gomes (9)
| Mike Miller (4)
| Target Center17,017
| 18–40

|- bgcolor="#ffcccc"
| 59
| March 1
| Houston
| 
| Randy Foye (24)
| Craig Smith, Mike Miller (6)
| Mike Miller (5)
| Target Center13,716
| 18–41
|- bgcolor="#ffcccc"
| 60
| March 3
| Golden State
| 
| Randy Foye (19)
| Kevin Love (14)
| Mike Miller (4)
| Target Center14,780
| 18–42
|- bgcolor="#ffcccc"
| 61
| March 6
| @ L.A. Lakers
| 
| Ryan Gomes (20)
| Kevin Love (14)
| Mike Miller (9)
| Staples Center18,997
| 18–43
|- bgcolor="#ffcccc"
| 62
| March 7
| @ Portland
| 
| Ryan Gomes (28)
| Mike Miller, Kevin Love, Jason Collins (7)
| Sebastian Telfair (7)
| Rose Garden20,535
| 18–44
|- bgcolor="#ffcccc"
| 63
| March 9
| Washington
| 
| Sebastian Telfair, Ryan Gomes (18)
| Kevin Love (11)
| Randy Foye (6)
| Target Center13,119
| 18–45
|- bgcolor="#bbffbb"
| 64
| March 11
| Memphis
| 
| Ryan Gomes (25)
| Kevin Love, Mike Miller (11)
| Ryan Gomes (5)
| Target Center12,443
| 19–45
|- bgcolor="#ffcccc"
| 65
| March 13
| New York
| 
| Ryan Gomes (28)
| Mike Miller (11)
| Mike Miller (7)
| Target Center14,311
| 19–46
|- bgcolor="#bbffbb"
| 66
| March 14
| Charlotte
| 
| Kevin Love (22)
| Kevin Love, Craig Smith (7)
| Sebastian Telfair (9)
| Target Center15,276
| 20–46
|- bgcolor="#ffcccc"
| 67
| March 17
| @ San Antonio
| 
| Sebastian Telfair, Kevin Love (17)
| Kevin Love (19)
| Sebastian Telfair (5)
| AT&T Center18,797
| 20–47
|- bgcolor="#ffcccc"
| 68
| March 18
| @ New Orleans
| 
| Kevin Love (23)
| Kevin Love (11)
| Sebastian Telfair (6)
| New Orleans Arena17,253
| 20–48
|- bgcolor="#ffcccc"
| 69
| March 20
| @ Houston
| 
| Craig Smith (19)
| Kevin Love (12)
| Mike Miller (7)
| Toyota Center17,456
| 20–49
|- bgcolor="#ffcccc"
| 70
| March 22
| Oklahoma City
| 
| Craig Smith (19)
| Craig Smith, Mike Miller (10)
| Bobby Brown, Mike Miller (4)
| Target Center18,561
| 20–50
|- bgcolor="#ffcccc"
| 71
| March 23
| @ Atlanta
| 
| Randy Foye (19)
| Mike Miller (9)
| Kevin Ollie, Sebastian Telfair (4)
| Philips Arena13,425
| 20–51
|- bgcolor="#ffcccc"
| 72
| March 25
| @ Philadelphia
| 
| Rodney Carney (21)
| Ryan Gomes, Kevin Love (9)
| Randy Foye, Kevin Ollie (4)
| Wachovia Center16,965
| 20–52
|- bgcolor="#ffcccc"
| 73
| March 27
| @ Cleveland
| 
| Kevin Love, Randy Foye (18)
| Kevin Love (6)
| Sebastian Telfair, Mike Miller (4)
| Quicken Loans Arena20,562
| 20–53
|- bgcolor="#bbffbb"
| 74
| March 29
| New Jersey
| 
| Mike Miller (22)
| Kevin Love (11)
| Kevin Ollie (7)
| Target Center16,539
| 21–53

|- bgcolor="#bbffbb"
| 76
| April 3
| @ Utah
| 
| Ryan Gomes, Rodney Carney (25)
| Mike Miller (9)
| Mike Miller (8)
| EnergySolutions Arena19,911
| 22–54
|- bgcolor="#ffcccc"
| 77
| April 5
| Denver
| 
| Sebastian Telfair (18)
| Shelden Williams (12)
| Mike Miller (6)
| Target Center16,839
| 22–55
|- bgcolor="#bbffbb"
| 78
| April 7
| @ L.A. Clippers
| 
| Ryan Gomes (24)
| Kevin Love (15)
| Sebastian Telfair, Mike Miller (6)
| Staples Center16,757
| 23–55
|- bgcolor="#bbffbb"
| 79
| April 8
| @ Golden State
| 
| Sebastian Telfair (21)
| Kevin Love (12)
| Mike Miller (6)
| Oracle Arena18,808
| 24–55
|- bgcolor="#ffcccc"
| 80
| April 11
| Phoenix
| 
| Sebastian Telfair (21)
| Mike Miller (9)
| Mike Miller (9)
| Target Center18,478
| 24–56
|- bgcolor="#ffcccc"
| 81
| April 13
| @ Dallas
| 
| Craig Smith (24)
| Kevin Love (11)
| Sebastian Telfair (12)
| American Airlines Center19,900
| 24–57
|- bgcolor="#ffcccc"
| 82
| April 15
| Sacramento
| 
| Craig Smith (18)
| Kevin Love (10)
| Sebastian Telfair (6)
| Target Center17,333
| 24–58

References

Minnesota Timberwolves seasons
Minnesota
2008 in sports in Minnesota
2009 in sports in Minnesota